April in the Afternoon is a talk show on Sky Television's Living channel in New Zealand.

References

New Zealand television talk shows